Heosphora desertella is a grass moth in the family Pyralidae. The species was first described by George Hampson as Saluria desertella in 1918. It is found in Australia.

Hampson describes the moth:Head and thorax white tinged with rufous; abdomen white, dorsally fulvous yellow towards base; Fore wing tinged with ochreous, the cilia whiter. Hind wing white.

References 

Pyralidae
Moths of Australia
Moths described in 1918
Taxa named by George Hampson